Bolshoy Ulyk is a rural locality (a village) in Chernushinsky District, Perm Krai, Russia. The population was 85 as of 2010. There are 2 streets.

Geography 
Bolshoy Ulyk is located 13 km east of Chernushka (the district's administrative centre) by road. Pavlovka is the nearest rural locality.

References 

Rural localities in Chernushinsky District